Magic publications are books and periodicals which are created on the subject of magic.  They include reviews of new equipment and techniques, announcements of upcoming events, interviews with prominent magicians, announcements of awards, and columns on such subjects as the history and ethics of the art of magic. Most also feature various explanations and ideas pertaining to magic tricks/effects. Additionally you can commonly advertise for businesses and events with little charge.

List of magic periodicals

List of notable books on magic 
 Modern Magic
 Discoverie of Witchcraft
 The Royal Road to Card Magic
 The Expert at the Card Table
 Bobo's Modern Coin Magic
 Sach's Sleight of Hand
 Master Index to Magic in Print
 Abbott's Encyclopedia of Rope Tricks
 Tarbell Course in Magic
 Thirteen Steps To Mentalism
The Amateur Magician's Handbook by Henry Hay
Mark Wilson's Complete Course in Magic

Further reading

References 

 
Entertainment lists